Trần Duy Khôi (born 20 July 1997; in District 1, Ho Chi Minh City) is a national-record holding swimmer from Vietnam. He swam for Vietnam at the 2014 Asian Games. 
At the 2014 Asian Games, he swam the Backstroke events and the Individual Medley events. He qualified prelim of 400m Individual Medley, completed this events with 7th position and broke himself national record with time 4 minutes 24.54 seconds.

References

1997 births
Living people
Vietnamese male swimmers
Swimmers at the 2014 Asian Games
Sportspeople from Ho Chi Minh City
Southeast Asian Games medalists in swimming
Southeast Asian Games silver medalists for Vietnam
Southeast Asian Games bronze medalists for Vietnam
Competitors at the 2013 Southeast Asian Games
Competitors at the 2015 Southeast Asian Games
Asian Games competitors for Vietnam